Liuhe Pagoda, literally Six Harmonies Pagoda, is a multi-story Chinese pagoda in southern Hangzhou, Zhejiang province, China. It is located at the foot of Yuelun Hill, facing the Qiantang River. It was originally constructed in 970 by the Wuyue Kingdom, destroyed in 1121, and reconstructed fully by 1165, during the Southern Song dynasty (1127–1279).

History and background
The pagoda was originally constructed by the ruler of the Wuyue Kingdom, whose capital was Hangzhou. The name Liuhe comes from the six Buddhist ordinances and it is said that the reason for building the pagoda was to calm the tidal bore of the Qiantang River and as a navigational aid. However, the pagoda was completely destroyed during warfare in the year 1121.

After the current pagoda was constructed of wood and brick during the Southern Song dynasty, additional exterior eaves were added during the Ming (1368–1644) and Qing Dynasties (1644–1911). There is a spiral staircase leading to the top floor and upon each of the seven ceilings are carved and painted figures including animals, flowers, birds and characters. Each story of the pagoda consists of four elements, the exterior walls, a zigzagged corridor, the interior walls and a small chamber. Viewed from outside, the pagoda appears to be layered-bright on the upper surface and dark underneath. That is a harmonious alternation of light and shade.

According to the British sinologist and historian Joseph Needham, the pagoda also served as a lighthouse along the Qiantang River. Being of considerable size and stature, it actually served as a permanent lighthouse from nearly its beginning, to aid sailors in seeking anchorage for their ships at night (as described in the Hangzhou Fu Zhi).

A small "Pagoda Park" has recently been opened nearby. Its exhibition features models of ancient Chinese pagodas and illustrates the variety of different designs, as well as history, culture and symbols associated with the pagoda.

See also
Burmese pagoda
Chinese architecture
Architecture of the Song dynasty
Chaitya & Stupa
List of tallest structures built before the 20th century

References

Citations

Sources 

 Needham, Joseph (1986). Science and Civilization in China: Volume 4, Physics and Physical Technology, Part 3, Civic Engineering and Nautics. Taipei: Caves Books, Ltd.

External links

Six Harmonies Pagoda

Liuhe Pagoda, Architectura Sinica Site Archive

Religious buildings and structures completed in 1165
Religious buildings and structures completed in 970
Pagodas in China
Buddhist temples in Hangzhou
Song dynasty architecture
Major National Historical and Cultural Sites in Zhejiang
Wuyue architecture
10th-century establishments in China
10th-century Buddhist temples